Ty-mawr Farmhouse, Ffwthog, Cwmyoy, Monmouthshire, is a farmhouse dating from the early 16th century, which was extended in the 17th century and then reduced in size in the 18th century. The farmhouse is a Grade II* listed building, with its range of barns and its bee shelter having separate Grade II listed building designations.

History
The original farmhouse dates from the early 16th century. In the 17th century, the house was extended and a new range constructed to a traditional H-plan. In the 18th century, the building was reduced in size, particularly impacting on the original 16th century building, of which little remains but the two-storey porch,  which formed the dairy to the 18th century house. The farmhouse remains a private residence and the architectural historian John Newman remarks on a "careful restoration" dating from 1995 to 1996.

Architecture and description
Cadw records that the farmhouse is of two storeys with attics. The building is of stone, which has been rendered, under a stone tile roof. The interior shows evidence that the farmhouse may have housed two separate households in the 17th century. The farmhouse is listed Grade II*. Adjacent to the house is the "impressive" seven-bay barn dating from the 17th century, which has its own Grade II listing. There is also a Grade II listed bee-shelter, which may date from the 19th century or may be earlier. In 2013 the bee-shelter was on the Brecon Beacons National Park Buildings at risk register.

Notes

References 
 

Grade II* listed buildings in Monmouthshire
Country houses in Wales